Anumanallur is a village in the Papanasam taluk of Thanjavur district, Tamil Nadu, India.

Demographics 

As per the 2001 census, Arumanallur had a total population of 540 with 259 males and 281 females. The sex ratio was 1085. The literacy rate was 64.72.

References 

 

Villages in Thanjavur district